Joseph Thompson may refer to:

Politicians
 Joseph Bryan Thompson (1871–1919), US Congressman from Oklahoma
 Joseph Thompson (Canadian politician) (1867–1941), speaker of the Legislature of Ontario
Joseph Oswalt Thompson, Alabama politician
 Joe Thompson (Australian politician) (1923–2005), member of the New South Wales Legislative Council

Sport
 Joe Thompson (rugby) (1902–1983), British rugby union and rugby league footballer
 Joe Thompson (footballer) (born 1989), English footballer
 Joseph Atang Thompson (born 1989), Nigerian football player
 Joe Thompson (speedway rider) (born 2004), English speedway rider

Others
 Joseph Thompson (actor) (active since 2005), English actor
 Joseph Thompson (doctor) (1797–1885), early settler of Atlanta, Georgia, hotelier, and real-estate investor
 Joseph H. Thompson (1871–1928), World War I Medal of Honor recipient and University of Pittsburgh hall of fame player and head coach
 Joseph Whitaker Thompson (1861–1946), American judge
 Joseph C. "Snake" Thompson (1874–1943), medical officer in the United States Navy
 Joe F. Thompson (born in 1930s), American aerospace engineer
 Joseph Parrish Thompson (1819–1879), American abolitionist and Baptist minister
 Joe Thompson (musician) (1918–2012), American musician
Joe Thompson of Joe Thompson vs Walter Clark
 Joseph Thompson (pirate) (died 1719), pirate from Trinidad, Cuba
 Joe Thompson (bookmaker) (1838–1909), bookmaker in Melbourne, Victoria, and London, England
 Joe Thompson (WW II pilot) (1919–2012), decorated World War II pilot

See also
Joseph Thomson (disambiguation)